The Isle of Man Civil Aviation Administration (IOM CAA) is the division of the Isle of Man Government's Department for Enterprise that is responsible for regulating aviation safety and security in the Isle of Man. The Isle of Man Civil Aviation Administration's Headquarters are situated at Ronaldsway Airport and the current Director of Civil Aviation is Simon Williams.

Responsibilities 
The IOM CAA also administers the Isle of Man Aircraft Registry and is responsible for ensuring aviation legislation in the Isle of Man meets International Civil Aviation Organization (ICAO) Standards and Recommended Practices in addition to other relevant European aviation standards.

The IOM CAA is responsible for the development and application of the Isle of Man's aviation safety and security regulations, policies, procedures and ICAO compliance. Part of the IOM CAA's remit is to ensure appropriate day to day safety and security oversight of the Island's aviation activities. In addition to this the IOM CAA also regulates the Isle of Man's Airport.

References

External links 
 

Organizations established in 2007
Civil aviation in the United Kingdom
Government of the Isle of Man